Zhili, alternately romanized as Chihli, was a northern administrative region of China since the 14th-century that lasted through the Ming dynasty and Qing dynasty until 1911, when the region was dissolved, converted to a province, and renamed Hebei in 1928.

History
The name Zhili means "directly ruled" and indicates regions directly ruled by the imperial government of China. Zhili province was first constituted during the Ming dynasty when the capital of China was located at Nanjing along the Yangtze River. In 1403, the Ming Yongle Emperor relocated the capital to Beiping, which was subsequently renamed Beijing.  The region known as North Zhili was composed of parts of the modern provinces of Hebei, Henan, Shandong, including the provincial-level municipalities of Beijing and Tianjin. There was another region located around the "reserve capital" Nanjing known as South Zhili that included parts of what are today the provinces of Jiangsu and Anhui, including the provincial-level municipality of Shanghai.

During the Qing dynasty, Nanjing lost its status as the "second capital" and Southern Zhili was reconstituted as a regular province, Jiangnan, while Northern Zhili was renamed Zhili Province. In the 18th century the borders of Zhili province were redrawn and spread over what is today Beijing, Tianjin and the provinces of Hebei, Western Liaoning, Northern Henan, and the Inner Mongolia Autonomous Region.

After the collapse of Qing dynasty, in 1911, the National Government of the Republic of China converted Zhili into a province as Zhili Province. In 1928 the National Government assigned portions of northern Zhili province to its neighbors in the north and renamed the remainder Hebei Province.

See also

 Sili Province, a similar administrative region during the Han dynasty
 Zhongshu Sheng, a similar administrative region during the Yuan dynasty
 North Zhili and South Zhili, similar administrative regions during the Ming dynasty

Gallery

References

External links

  Complete Map of the Seven Coastal Provinces from 1821 to 1850

Administrative divisions of ancient China
Provinces of the Republic of China (1912–1949)
States and territories disestablished in 1928